65th Infantry Division could refer to:

65th Infantry Division (Russian Empire)
65th Infantry Division (United States)
65th Infantry Division (Wehrmacht)